The University of Dubuque Theological Seminary is one of the ten official seminaries of the Presbyterian Church (USA). It is located in Dubuque, Iowa. Originally classes were taught in German to serve the immigrant population, but today the school is well known for its emphasis on Native American and rural ministry and on-line education.  It is a seminary within the larger University of Dubuque.

Presbyterian Church (USA) seminaries
Seminaries and theological colleges in Iowa